Edmund Shakespeare (1580 in Stratford-upon-Avon – buried 31 December 1607 in London) was a 16th- and 17th-century English actor, and the brother of William Shakespeare.

Life
He was the youngest child of John Shakespeare and Mary Arden and the brother of William Shakespeare. He followed William to London to become an actor. While an actor, he had an affair with an unknown woman, probably around 1600 although there is no firm evidence. He fathered a son, Edward Shakespeare, in one record noted wrongly as Edmund Sharksbye. He died in 1607, at the age of 27, four months after the death of his son. Twenty shillings was paid for his burial (possibly by William) at St Saviour's in Southwark (known today as Southwark Cathedral) "with a forenoone knell of the great bell".

In popular culture

Edmund Shakespeare was the subject of a one-man show, written and performed by the British actor Ben Deery, in 2012, at The Last Refuge, Peckham, London. The play's title Most Savage and Unnatural, alludes to a line spoken by the character of Edmund in the play King Lear by William Shakespeare. The performance included elements of audience participation and was warmly received.

He appears as Ned Shakespeare in Nicole Galland's science fiction/time travel novel Master of the Revels, published in 2021.

References
 Samuel Schoenbaum, William Shakespeare: a documentary life (1975), p. 26
 Mabillard, Amanda. Shakespeare of Stratford: "Shakespeare's Siblings". Shakespeare Online. 12 Sept. 2000.
 Bentley, Gerald  Eades. Shakespeare: A Biographical Handbook. New Haven, CT: Yale University Press, 1961. Archive.org.

1580 births
1607 deaths
16th-century English male actors
17th-century English male actors
English male stage actors
People from Stratford-upon-Avon
Shakespeare family